Antaeotricha is a genus of moths. It is the largest genus in the subfamily Stenomatinae, numbering over 400 species in the Western Hemisphere.

Species
Antaeotricha acrograpta (Meyrick, 1915)
Antaeotricha acronephela Meyrick, 1915
Antaeotricha actista (Meyrick, 1913)
Antaeotricha addon (Busck, 1911)
Antaeotricha adjunctella (Walker, 1864)
Antaeotricha admixta (Walsingham, 1913)
Antaeotricha adornata (Meyrick, 1915)
Antaeotricha aequabilis (Meyrick, 1916)
Antaeotricha aerinotata (Butler, 1877)
Antaeotricha affinis (Felder & Rogenhofer, 1875)
Antaeotricha aggravata (Meyrick, 1916)
Antaeotricha aglypta Meyrick, 1925
Antaeotricha agrioschista (Meyrick, 1927)
Antaeotricha albicilla (Zeller, 1854)
Antaeotricha albifrons Zeller, 1877
Antaeotricha albilimbella (Felder & Rogenhofer, 1875)
Antaeotricha albitincta (Meyrick, 1930)
Antaeotricha albovenosa Zeller, 1877
Antaeotricha albulella (Walker, 1864)
Antaeotricha amicula Zeller, 1877
Antaeotricha ammodes (Walsingham, 1913)
Antaeotricha amphilyta Meyrick, 1916
Antaeotricha amphizyga Meyrick, 1930
Antaeotricha anaclintris Meyrick, 1916
Antaeotricha arachnia (Meyrick, 1915)
Antaeotricha aratella (Walker, 1864)
Antaeotricha arizonensis Ferris, 2010 - Ferris's antaeotricha moth
Antaeotricha argocorys (Meyrick, 1931)
Antaeotricha arystis Meyrick, 1915
Antaeotricha assecta Zeller, 1877
Antaeotricha astynoma (Meyrick, 1915)
Antaeotricha atmospora (Meyrick, 1925)
Antaeotricha axena Meyrick, 1916
Antaeotricha balanocentra (Meyrick, 1915)
Antaeotricha ballista (Meyrick, 1916)
Antaeotricha basalis Zeller, 1854
Antaeotricha basiferella (Walker, 1864)
Antaeotricha basilaris (Busck, 1914)
Antaeotricha basirubrella (Walker, 1864)
Antaeotricha bathrotoma (Meyrick, 1925)
Antaeotricha biarcuata Meyrick, 1926
Antaeotricha bicolor (Zeller, 1839)
Antaeotricha bilinguis (Meyrick, 1918)
Antaeotricha binubila Zeller, 1854
Antaeotricha bipupillata Meyrick, 1930
Antaeotricha bracatingae (Köhler, 1943)
Antaeotricha brachysaris Meyrick, 1916
Antaeotricha brochota Meyrick, 1915
Antaeotricha caenochytis (Meyrick, 1915)
Antaeotricha camarina Meyrick, 1915
Antaeotricha campylodes Meyrick, 1916
Antaeotricha cantharitis (Meyrick, 1916)
Antaeotricha caprimulga (Walsingham, 1912)
Antaeotricha capsiformis (Meyrick, 1930)
Antaeotricha capsulata Meyrick, 1918
Antaeotricha carabodes (Meyrick, 1915)
Antaeotricha carabophanes Meyrick, 1932
Antaeotricha carbasea (Meyrick, 1915)
Antaeotricha caryograpta (Meyrick, 1930)
Antaeotricha cathagnista Meyrick, 1925
Antaeotricha catharactis Meyrick, 1930
Antaeotricha cedroxyla Meyrick, 1930
Antaeotricha celidotis Meyrick, 1925
Antaeotricha ceratistes (Walsingham, 1912)
Antaeotricha chalastis (Meyrick, 1915)
Antaeotricha chalinophanes (Meyrick, 1931)
Antaeotricha chilosema (Meyrick, 1918)
Antaeotricha christocoma Meyrick, 1915
Antaeotricha cicadella (Sepp, [1830])
Antaeotricha cirrhoxantha (Meyrick, 1915)
Antaeotricha cleopatra Meyrick, 1925
Antaeotricha cnemosaris (Meyrick, 1925)
Antaeotricha colposaris (Meyrick, 1925)
Antaeotricha comosa (Walsingham, 1912)
Antaeotricha compsographa Meyrick, 1916
Antaeotricha compsoneura (Meyrick, 1925)
Antaeotricha confixella (Walker, 1864)
Antaeotricha congelata Meyrick, 1926
Antaeotricha coniopa (Meyrick, 1925)
Antaeotricha constituta (Meyrick, 1925)
Antaeotricha constricta (Meyrick, 1926)
Antaeotricha conturbatella (Walker, 1864)
Antaeotricha copromima (Meyrick, 1930)
Antaeotricha coriodes Meyrick, 1915
Antaeotricha corvigera Meyrick, 1915
Antaeotricha cosmoterma Meyrick, 1930
Antaeotricha costatella (Walker, 1864)
Antaeotricha cremastis (Meyrick, 1925)
Antaeotricha cryeropis Meyrick, 1926
Antaeotricha crypsiphaea (Meyrick, 1915)
Antaeotricha cyclobasis Meyrick, 1930
Antaeotricha cycnolopha (Meyrick, 1925)
Antaeotricha cycnomorpha Meyrick, 1925
Antaeotricha cymogramma (Meyrick, 1925)
Antaeotricha cyprodeta Meyrick, 1930
Antaeotricha decorosella (Busck, 1908)
Antaeotricha deltopis Meyrick, 1915
Antaeotricha demas (Busck, 1911)
Antaeotricha demotica (Walsingham, 1912)
Antaeotricha deridens Meyrick, 1925
Antaeotricha desecta (Meyrick, 1918)
Antaeotricha destillata (Zeller, 1877)
Antaeotricha diacta (Meyrick, 1916)
Antaeotricha diffracta Meyrick, 1916
Antaeotricha diplarcha Meyrick, 1915
Antaeotricha diplophaea Meyrick, 1916
Antaeotricha diplosaris (Meyrick, 1915)
Antaeotricha dirempta (Zeller, 1855)
Antaeotricha discalis (Busck, 1914)
Antaeotricha discolor (Walsingham, 1912)
Antaeotricha disjecta (Zeller, 1854)
Antaeotricha dissona (Meyrick, 1925)
Antaeotricha doleropis (Meyrick, 1915)
Antaeotricha dromica (Meyrick, 1925)
Antaeotricha elaeodes (Walsingham, 1913)
Antaeotricha elatior (Felder & Rogenhofer, 1875)
Antaeotricha encyclia Meyrick, 1915
Antaeotricha enodata Meyrick, 1916
Antaeotricha epicrossa (Meyrick, 1932)
Antaeotricha epignampta Meyrick, 1915
Antaeotricha episimbla (Meyrick, 1915)
Antaeotricha ergates (Walsingham, 1913)
Antaeotricha erotica (Meyrick, 1916)
Antaeotricha eucoma Meyrick, 1925
Antaeotricha euthrinca Meyrick, 1915
Antaeotricha exasperata (Meyrick, 1916)
Antaeotricha excisa Meyrick, 1916
Antaeotricha extenta (Busck, 1920)
Antaeotricha exusta Meyrick, 1916
Antaeotricha falsidica (Meyrick, 1915)
Antaeotricha fasciatum (Busck, 1911)
Antaeotricha fascicularis Zeller, 1854
Antaeotricha filiferella (Walker, 1864)
Antaeotricha floridella Hayden & Dickel, 2015
Antaeotricha forreri (Walsingham, 1913)
Antaeotricha fractilinea (Walsingham, 1912)
Antaeotricha fractinubes (Walsingham, 1912)
Antaeotricha fraterna (Felder & Rogenhofer, 1875)
Antaeotricha frontalis (Zeller, 1855)
Antaeotricha fulta Meyrick, 1926
Antaeotricha fumifica (Walsingham, 1912)
Antaeotricha furcata (Walsingham, 1889)
Antaeotricha fuscorectangulata Duckworth, 1964
Antaeotricha generatrix Meyrick, 1926
Antaeotricha glaphyrodes (Meyrick, 1913)
Antaeotricha glaucescens (Meyrick, 1916)
Antaeotricha glycerostoma Meyrick, 1915
Antaeotricha graphopterella (Walker, 1864)
Antaeotricha gravescens Meyrick, 1926
Antaeotricha griseanomina Busck, 1934
Antaeotricha gubernatrix Meyrick, 1925
Antaeotricha gymnolopha Meyrick, 1925
Antaeotricha gypsoterma (Meyrick, 1915)
Antaeotricha habilis (Meyrick, 1915)
Antaeotricha haesitans (Walsingham, 1912)
Antaeotricha haplocentra Meyrick, 1925
Antaeotricha hapsicora Meyrick, 1915
Antaeotricha helicias Meyrick, 1916
Antaeotricha hemibathra Meyrick, 1932
Antaeotricha hemiscia (Walsingham, 1912)
Antaeotricha herilis Felder & Rogenhofer, 1875
Antaeotricha heterosaris (Meyrick, 1915)
Antaeotricha himaea Meyrick, 1916
Antaeotricha homologa (Meyrick, 1915)
Antaeotricha horizontias (Meyrick, 1925)
Antaeotricha humerella (Walker, 1864)
Antaeotricha humilis (Zeller, 1855) - dotted anteotricha moth 
Antaeotricha hyalophanta (Meyrick, 1932)
Antaeotricha hydrophora Meyrick, 1925
Antaeotricha ianthina (Walsingham, 1913)
Antaeotricha illepida Meyrick, 1916
Antaeotricha imminens (Meyrick, 1915)
Antaeotricha immota Meyrick, 1916
Antaeotricha impactella (Walker, 1864)
Antaeotricha impedita (Meyrick, 1915)
Antaeotricha incisurella (Walker, 1864)
Antaeotricha incompleta Meyrick, 1932
Antaeotricha incongrua Meyrick, 1932
Antaeotricha incrassata Meyrick, 1916
Antaeotricha indicatella (Walker, 1864)
Antaeotricha infecta (Meyrick, 1930)
Antaeotricha infrenata (Meyrick, 1918)
Antaeotricha innexa (Meyrick, 1925)
Antaeotricha inquinula Zeller, 1854
Antaeotricha insidiata (Meyrick, 1916)
Antaeotricha insimulata Meyrick, 1926
Antaeotricha intersecta (Meyrick, 1916)
Antaeotricha iopetra (Meyrick, 1932)
Antaeotricha ioptila (Meyrick, 1915)
Antaeotricha iras Meyrick, 1926
Antaeotricha irene (Barnes & Busck, 1920)
Antaeotricha irenias (Meyrick, 1916)
Antaeotricha isochyta (Meyrick, 1915)
Antaeotricha isomeris (Meyrick, 1912)
Antaeotricha isoplintha (Meyrick, 1925)
Antaeotricha isoporphyra (Meyrick, 1932)
Antaeotricha isosticta (Meyrick, 1932)
Antaeotricha isotona Meyrick, 1932
Antaeotricha ithytona Meyrick, 1929
Antaeotricha juvenalis (Meyrick, 1930)
Antaeotricha lacera (Zeller, 1877)
Antaeotricha lampyridella (Busck, 1914)
Antaeotricha lathiptila (Meyrick, 1915)
Antaeotricha laudata Meyrick, 1916
Antaeotricha laxa (Meyrick, 1915)
Antaeotricha lebetias (Meyrick, 1915)
Antaeotricha lecithaula Meyrick, 1914
Antaeotricha lepidocarpa (Meyrick, 1930)
Antaeotricha leptogramma (Meyrick, 1916)
Antaeotricha leucillana Zeller, 1854 - pale gray bird-dropping moth
Antaeotricha leucocryptis (Meyrick, 1932)
Antaeotricha lignicolor Zeller, 1877
Antaeotricha lindseyi (Barnes & Busck, 1920)
Antaeotricha lophoptycha (Meyrick, 1925)
Antaeotricha lophosaris (Meyrick, 1925)
Antaeotricha loxogrammos (Zeller, 1854)
Antaeotricha lucrosa (Meyrick, 1925)
Antaeotricha lunimaculata (Dognin, 1913)
Antaeotricha lysimeris Meyrick, 1915
Antaeotricha machetes (Walsingham, 1912)
Antaeotricha macronota (Meyrick, 1912)
Antaeotricha malachita Meyrick, 1915
Antaeotricha manceps Meyrick, 1925
Antaeotricha manzanitae Keifer, 1937
Antaeotricha marmorea (Felder & Rogenhofer, 1875)
Antaeotricha melanarma Meyrick, 1916
Antaeotricha melanopis Meyrick, 1909
Antaeotricha mendax (Zeller, 1855)
Antaeotricha mesosaris (Meyrick, 1925)
Antaeotricha mesostrota Meyrick, 1912
Antaeotricha microtypa (Meyrick, 1915)
Antaeotricha milictis Meyrick, 1925
Antaeotricha mitratella (Busck, 1914)
Antaeotricha modulata (Meyrick, 1915)
Antaeotricha monocolona Meyrick, 1932
Antaeotricha monosaris (Meyrick, 1915)
Antaeotricha mundella (Walker, 1864)
Antaeotricha murinella (Walker, 1864)
Antaeotricha mustela (Walsingham, 1912)
Antaeotricha navicularis (Meyrick, 1930)
Antaeotricha neocrossa (Meyrick, 1925)
Antaeotricha nephelocyma (Meyrick, 1930)
Antaeotricha nerteropa Meyrick, 1915
Antaeotricha neurographa Meyrick, 1922
Antaeotricha nictitans (Zeller, 1854)
Antaeotricha nimbata Meyrick, 1925
Antaeotricha nitescens Meyrick, 1925
Antaeotricha nitidorella (Walker, 1864)
Antaeotricha nitrota Meyrick, 1916
Antaeotricha notogramma (Meyrick, 1930)
Antaeotricha notosaris (Meyrick, 1925)
Antaeotricha notosemia (Zeller, 1877)
Antaeotricha nuclearis Meyrick, 1913
Antaeotricha obtusa (Meyrick, 1916)
Antaeotricha ocellifer (Walsingham, 1912)
Antaeotricha ogmolopha (Meyrick, 1930)
Antaeotricha ogmosaris (Meyrick, 1915)
Antaeotricha ophrysta Meyrick, 1912
Antaeotricha orgadopa (Meyrick, 1925)
Antaeotricha orthophaea Meyrick, 1930
Antaeotricha orthotona Meyrick, 1916
Antaeotricha orthriopa Meyrick, 1925
Antaeotricha osseella (Walsingham, 1889)
Antaeotricha ostodes (Walsingham, 1913)
Antaeotricha ovulifera (Meyrick, 1925)
Antaeotricha oxycentra Meyrick, 1916
Antaeotricha oxydecta (Meyrick, 1915)
Antaeotricha pactota Meyrick, 1915
Antaeotricha palaestrias Meyrick, 1916
Antaeotricha pallicosta (Felder & Rogenhofer, 1875)
Antaeotricha paracrypta Meyrick, 1915
Antaeotricha paracta (Meyrick, 1915)
Antaeotricha parastis van Gijen, 1913
Antaeotricha particularis (Zeller, 1877)
Antaeotricha pellocoma (Meyrick, 1915)
Antaeotricha percnocarpa (Meyrick, 1925)
Antaeotricha percnogona Meyrick, 1925
Antaeotricha periphrictis (Meyrick, 1915)
Antaeotricha phaeoneura (Meyrick, 1913)
Antaeotricha phaeoplintha (Meyrick, 1915)
Antaeotricha phaeosaris Meyrick, 1915
Antaeotricha phaselodes (Meyrick, 1931)
Antaeotricha phaula (Walsingham, 1912)
Antaeotricha phollicodes (Meyrick, 1916)
Antaeotricha phryactis Meyrick, 1925
Antaeotricha planicoma (Meyrick, 1925)
Antaeotricha platydesma Meyrick, 1915
Antaeotricha plerotis Meyrick, 1925
Antaeotricha plesistia (Meyrick, 1930)
Antaeotricha plumosa (Busck, 1914)
Antaeotricha polyglypta (Meyrick, 1915)
Antaeotricha praecisa Meyrick, 1912
Antaeotricha praerupta Meyrick, 1915
Antaeotricha pratifera (Meyrick, 1925)
Antaeotricha prosora (Walsingham, 1912)
Antaeotricha protosaris Meyrick, 1915
Antaeotricha pseudochyta Meyrick, 1915
Antaeotricha ptycta (Walsingham, 1912)
Antaeotricha pumilis (Busck, 1914)
Antaeotricha purulenta Zeller, 1877
Antaeotricha pyrgota (Meyrick, 1930)
Antaeotricha pyrobathra (Meyrick, 1931)
Antaeotricha pythonaea Meyrick, 1916
Antaeotricha quiescens (Meyrick, 1916)
Antaeotricha radicalis (Zeller, 1877)
Antaeotricha radicicola Meyrick, 1932
Antaeotricha reciprocella (Walker, 1864)
Antaeotricha reductella (Walker, 1864)
Antaeotricha refractrix Meyrick, 1930
Antaeotricha renselariana (Stoll, [1781])
Antaeotricha reprehensa Meyrick, 1926
Antaeotricha resiliens Meyrick, 1925
Antaeotricha rhipidaula (Meyrick, 1915)
Antaeotricha ribbei Zeller, 1877
Antaeotricha rostriformis (Meyrick, 1916)
Antaeotricha sana Meyrick, 1926
Antaeotricha sarcinata Meyrick, 1918
Antaeotricha sardania Meyrick, 1925
Antaeotricha scapularis (Meyrick, 1918)
Antaeotricha schlaegeri (Zeller, 1854) - Schlaeger's fruitworm moth
Antaeotricha sciospila (Meyrick, 1930)
Antaeotricha segmentata (Meyrick, 1915)
Antaeotricha sellifera Meyrick, 1925
Antaeotricha semicinerea Zeller, 1877
Antaeotricha semiovata Meyrick, 1926
Antaeotricha semisignella (Walker, 1864)
Antaeotricha serangodes Meyrick, 1915
Antaeotricha serarcha Meyrick, 1930
Antaeotricha similis (Busck, 1911)
Antaeotricha smileuta Meyrick, 1915
Antaeotricha sortifera Meyrick, 1930
Antaeotricha sparganota Meyrick, 1915
Antaeotricha spermolitha (Meyrick, 1915)
Antaeotricha spurca (Zeller, 1855)
Antaeotricha spurcatella (Walker, 1864)
Antaeotricha staurota Meyrick, 1916
Antaeotricha sterrhomitra (Meyrick, 1925)
Antaeotricha stigmatias (Walsingham, 1913)
Antaeotricha stringens Meyrick, 1925
Antaeotricha stygeropa (Meyrick, 1925)
Antaeotricha subdulcis (Meyrick, 1925)
Antaeotricha substricta Meyrick, 1918
Antaeotricha suffumigata Walsingham, 1897
Antaeotricha superciliosa Meyrick, 1918
Antaeotricha synercta Meyrick, 1925
Antaeotricha tectoria (Meyrick, 1915)
Antaeotricha teleosema Meyrick, 1925
Antaeotricha tempestiva (Meyrick, 1916)
Antaeotricha tephrodesma (Meyrick, 1916)
Antaeotricha tetrapetra (Meyrick, 1925)
Antaeotricha thammii Zeller, 1877
Antaeotricha thapsinopa Meyrick, 1916
Antaeotricha theoretica Meyrick, 1932
Antaeotricha thesmophora Meyrick, 1915
Antaeotricha thomasi (Barnes & Busck, 1920)
Antaeotricha thylacosaris (Meyrick, 1915)
Antaeotricha thysanodes (Meyrick, 1915)
Antaeotricha tibialis Zeller, 1877
Antaeotricha tinactis (Meyrick, 1915)
Antaeotricha tornogramma Meyrick, 1925
Antaeotricha tractrix Meyrick, 1925
Antaeotricha tremulella (Walker, 1864)
Antaeotricha tribomias (Meyrick, 1915)
Antaeotricha tricapsis (Meyrick, 1930)
Antaeotricha trichonota Meyrick, 1926
Antaeotricha triplectra (Meyrick, 1915)
Antaeotricha triplintha (Meyrick, 1916)
Antaeotricha tripustulella (Walker, 1864)
Antaeotricha trisecta (Walsingham, 1912)
Antaeotricha trisinuata Meyrick, 1930
Antaeotricha tritogramma Meyrick, 1925
Antaeotricha trivallata Meyrick, 1934
Antaeotricha trochoscia Meyrick, 1915
Antaeotricha tumens (Meyrick, 1916)
Antaeotricha umbratella Walker, 1864
Antaeotricha umbriferella (Walker, 1864)
Antaeotricha unipunctella (Clemens, 1863)
Antaeotricha unisecta (Meyrick, 1930)
Antaeotricha utahensis Ferris, 2012
Antaeotricha vacata Meyrick, 1925
Antaeotricha vannifera (Meyrick, 1915)
Antaeotricha venatum (Busck, 1911)
Antaeotricha venezuelensis Amsel, 1956
Antaeotricha virens (Meyrick, 1912)
Antaeotricha walchiana (Stoll, [1782])
Antaeotricha xanthopetala (Meyrick, 1931)
Antaeotricha xuthosaris Meyrick, 1925
Antaeotricha xylocosma Meyrick, 1916
Antaeotricha xylurga (Meyrick, 1913)
Antaeotricha zanclogramma (Meyrick, 1915)
Antaeotricha zelleri Walsingham & Durrant, 1896
Antaeotricha zelotes (Walsingham, 1912)

Former species
Antaeotricha vestalis (Zeller, 1873) - vestal moth

References

External links
North American Moths – Oecophoridae

 
Stenomatinae
Moth genera